Grodno Voivodeship (1793) was created during the Grodno Sejm in November 23 1793. The Voivodeship had capital in Grodno. It was not fully organised because of the start of Kościuszko Uprising in 1794.

The Voivodeship consisted of three parts:
 Grodno Land
 Wołkowysk Land
 Sokółka Land

References 
Volumina legum t. 10 Konstytucje Sejmu Grodzieńskiego z 1793 roku, Poznań 1952

Former voivodeships of Grand Duchy of Lithuania